Videoclub (stylized as VIDEOCLUB) was a French musical project formed in Nantes, France in 2018 by Adèle Castillon and Matthieu Reynaud.

They became popular for the song "Amour Plastique", which was released in the September of 2018, which has accumulated more than 107 million views on YouTube as of March 2023. Additionally, they were characterized by being a romantic couple for most of the time that the duo was together.

They released a total of 7 singles, a collaboration, and a studio album, Euphories.

On March 31, 2021, the duo announced that Matthieu would be leaving the project, due to the breakup of the couple.

History 
Prior to Videoclub, Castillon was an actress and had her own YouTube channel while Reynaud learned to produce music with his father, who was a musician. Castillon and Reynaud met through a mutual friend and subsequently decided to make music together.

Musical style and influences 
The group's musical style is heavily influenced by music during the 1980s but draws inspiration from contemporary music as well. Musical artists Odezenne, Superbus, Fauve, Vendredi sur Mer, Dinos, Mac DeMarco, Tame Impala, and Chromatics have been cited as sources of inspiration for the group's music; in particular, Reynaud's guitar riffs were influenced by 1980s groups such as The Cure, New Order, and Pixies. The duo have also taken inspiration from Jacques Demy films for their lyrics.

Discography

Studio albums

Singles

References 

2018 establishments in France
French synthpop groups
French electronic music groups
Musical groups established in 2018